Elections were held in the organized municipalities in the Kenora District of Ontario on October 27, 2014 in conjunction with municipal elections across the province.

Dryden

Ear Falls

Ignace

Kenora

Machin

Pickle Lake

Red Lake

Sioux Lookout

Sioux Narrows-Nestor Falls

References
 Results

Kenora
Kenora District